The Kingston Canadian Film Festival is an annual celebration of the best in Canadian cinema held in Kingston, Ontario. It is the largest stand-alone showcase of feature films from across Canada. The 2021 festival took place from February 26 to March 7, and was the first-ever digital version of the Kingston Canadian Film Festival.

In addition to the best new Canadian films of the year, KCFF presents workshops, panels, live music and podcasts, plus many special guests, with past appearances by Elliot Page, Gordon Pinsent, Deepa Mehta, Cathy Jones, plus cast from Kids in the Hall, Letterkenny, Mr. D, and The Trailer Park Boys.

The Kingston Canadian Film Festival is held annually in late February to early March and is a registered charity. The festival director is Marc Garniss, associate director is Megan Sirett, features programmer is Jason Anderson, and chair of the board of directors is Blaine Allan.

History 
The Kingston Canadian Film Festival was launched in 2001 by Alex Jansen, who was then studying film at Queen's University. It was a three-day event held at the Screening Room Movie Theater, a two screen repertory cinema which Jansen was managing at the time. The Festival was launched with assistance from Moving Pictures: Canadian Films on Tour (who were replaced by the Toronto International Film Festival Group in 2003). In 2002, the Festival added a second, larger venue on the Queen's University campus, increased the number of screenings substantially and added a fourth day to the event, becoming the largest stand-alone showcase of feature films from across Canada.

 In 2003, the Festival launched its ongoing "Local Filmmaking Initiative" (LFI), a multi-tiered program focused towards nurturing the local film making community, through the City of Kingston's Healthy Community Fund. 
 In 2004, the Festival added a fourth venue by temporarily re-opening the Princess Court Cinema. 
 In 2005, Alison Migneault became Co-Director of the Kingston Canadian Film Festival. The Festival moved its main venue to the Empire Theatre and added a fifth day to the event. 
 In 2006, Migneault became full Director of the Kingston Canadian Film Festival and Jansen moved into a consulting position. The Festival launched a new French Community Outreach program aimed at Kingston's sizeable French-speaking population. 
 In 2007, the Kingston Canadian Film Festival launched its first-ever retrospective series, around the 50th anniversary of film making by the acclaimed Canadian director Allan King. 
 In 2008, the Kingston Canadian Film Festival staged high school outreach in partnership with Reel Canada. 
 In 2009, the Festival held a local short film competition (10 Years, 10 Minutes) and awarded $5,000 cash and professional mentorship for a local team to produce a short film to br premiered at the 2010 festival.
 In 2010, the Kingston Canadian Film Festival celebrated its 10th anniversary, premiered the winner of the 10 Years, 10 Minutes Award and hosted a special screening of the silent film Carry On Sergeant!.
 In 2012, the Festival hosted another silent film screening – Back to God’s Country - at the Grand Theatre. Attendance at the festival increased by 11% over the 2011 event.
 In 2013, the Kingston Canadian Film Festival hosted the Oscar winner Mychael Danna (Life of Pi) at the Filmmakers’ Reception.
 In 2014, the Festival increased box office by 25% and surpassed the attendance record set in 2010. Marc Garniss became the full-time Festival Director.
 In 2015, box office increased by 21% over 2014 with a total audience of 5,750. Dedicated showcases for youth filmmakers were established.  KCFF introduced a music in film program. There were appearances by Paul Spence (Deaner from FUBAR), Greg Keelor of Blue Rodeo, Don McKellar, and over 50 other special guests.
 In 2016, the Festival increased box office for the third successive year, surpassing 2015 by 15%. KCFF: Interactive introduced video game development workshops. Guantanamo's Child: Omar Khadr won the Eye on Canada People's Choice Award. There were special guest appearances by Scott Thompson, K Trevor Wilson, Jess Allen, Brian D. Johnston, Sarah Harmer, Conner Jessup, and over 60 other industry guests.
 In 2017, Operation Avalanche was awarded the Limestone Financial People's Choice Award.
 In 2018, Don't Talk To Irene was awarded the Limestone Financial People's Choice Award.
In 2019, The Grizzlies was awarded the Limestone Financial People's Choice Award.  Special guests included Miranda de Pencier, Gerry Dee, Aurora Browne, Jennifer Whalen, K. Trevor Wilson, Bif Naked, Maxime Giroux, Kim Nguyen, Phillipe Lesage, Darlene Naponse, Caroline Bartczak, Robert Budreau, Piers Handling, Alison Reid, and many others.
 In 2020, the Festival was originally scheduled for March 11–15, but cancelled due to the COVID-19 pandemic.
 In 2021, the Festival was entirely virtual.You Will Remember Me / Tu te souviendras de moi and Beans were awarded the Limestone Financial People's Choice Award.

Programs

Canadian Features
The Kingston Canadian Film Festival showcase 30-40 of the best Canadian features of the year. Features include work from first-time filmmakers, as well as Oscar winners. The Canadian Features also have a strong focus on French filmmaking, and films created by indigenous directors.

Canadian Shorts
Every year, KCFF generally display 3 distinct Canadian short programs. Each program presents its own theme. Typically, the festival plays 50-75 short films.

Special Events
In addition to the movies, KCFF showcase live music and comedy, podcasts, receptions, awards and parties. These program offer local filmmakers the opportunity to meet industry professionals. Notable guests include Elliot Page, Gordon Pinsent, Deepa Mehta, Cathy Jones, plus cast from Kids in the Hall, Letterkenny, Mr. D, and The Trailer Park Boys. KCFF also presents screenings and events throughout the year, with recent live shows featuring the Canadaland and Taggart and Torrens podcasts. KCFF also presents its own podcast called Rewind Fast Forward, with host Thom Ernst.

Editions and selected films

2021 
The digital edition of the Kingston Canadian Film Festival, included short film programs (with dedicated slots for local artists and youth), free workshops, industry guest appearances and awards, everything by Livestream.

2021 Feature Films 
 Anne at 13,000 Ft. — Kazik Radwanski
 Beans — Tracey Deer
 Bloodthirsty — Amelia Moses
 Call Me Human (Je m'apelle humain) — Kim O'Bomsawin
 Death of a Ladies' Man — Matt Bissonnette
 Drifting Snow — Ryan Noth
 First We Eat — Suzanne Crocker
 How to Fix Radios — Emily Russell, Casper Leonard
 Marlene — Wendy Hill-Tout
 Mouth Congress — Paul Bellini, Scott Thompson
 My Salinger Year — Philippe Falardeau
 My Very Own Circus (Mon cirque à moi) — Miryam Bouchard
 Nadia, Butterfly — Pascal Plante
 No Ordinary Man — Aisling Chin-Yee, Chase Joynt
 No Visible Trauma —  Marc Serpa Francoeur, Robinder Uppal
 Out of the Blue - Dennis Hopper
 Restless River — Marie-Hélène Cousineau, Madeline Ivalu
 Shiva Baby — Emma Seligman
 Spirit Bear and Children Make History — Amanda Strong
 The Kid Detective — Evan Morgan
 The Magnitude of All Things — Jennifer Abbott
 The Paper Man (Lafortune en papier) — Tanya Lapointe
 Vagrant — Caleb Ryan
 Workhorse — Cliff Caines
 You Will Remember Me (Tu te souviendras de moi) — Éric Tessier

2021 Podcast Guests 
 Jeff Barnaby
 Audrey Cummings
 Matt Johnson
 Sean Garrity
 Vicki Lean

KCFF 2021 Award Winner 
BEST CANADIAN SHORT
 Scars dir. Alex Anna

FAVOURITE CANADIAN SHORT
 Sinking Ship dir. Sasha Leigh Henry

BEST YOUTH SHORT
 Call Of The Void dir. Kyla Stone

FAVOURITE YOUTH SHORT
 Elliot Shepard's Concerto in D Minor dir. E.J. Graham

STEAM WHISTLE HOMEBREW AWARD FOR BEST LOCAL SHORT
 Daffodils dir. Adrien Benson

STEAM WHISTLE HOMEBREW AWARD FOR FAVOURITE LOCAL SHORT
 A Chinese Love Song dir. Lara Besa

LIMESTONE FINANCIAL PEOPLE’S CHOICE AWARD
 You Will Remember Me (Tu te souviendras de moi) dir. Eric Tessier
 Beans dir. Tracey Deer

References

Film festivals in Ontario
Festivals in Kingston, Ontario
Film festivals established in 2001
Tourist attractions in Kingston, Ontario
2001 establishments in Ontario